Michael Henry Pertwee (24 April 1916, Kensington, London – 17 April 1991, Camden, London) was an English playwright and screenwriter. Among his credits were episodes of The Saint, Danger Man, Alfred Hitchcock Presents, B-And-B, Ladies Who Do, Hong Kong and many other films and TV series. For the stage he co-wrote the 1938 thriller Death on the Table.

He was the brother of Jon Pertwee, the son of Roland Pertwee, the screenwriter and actor of the 1910s–1950s, a distant cousin of Bill Pertwee, the character actor, and the uncle of actor Sean Pertwee.

Filmography

Writer
 Crackerjack (1938)
 Trouble in the Air (1948)
 The Interrupted Journey (1949)
 Something in the City (1950)
 Black Jack (1950)
 Laughter in Paradise (1951)
 Night Was Our Friend (1951)
 Not Wanted on Voyage (1957)
 The Naked Truth (1957)
 Too Many Crooks (1959)
  It Started in Naples (1960)
In the Doghouse (1962)
 Strange Bedfellows (1965)
 A Funny Thing Happened on the Way to the Forum (film) (1966)
 Salt and Pepper (1968)
 One More Time (1970)
 Digby, the Biggest Dog in the World (1973)

Actor
 Laughter in Paradise (1951) - Stewart
 Night Was Our Friend (1951) - Young Man
 Now and Forever (1956) - Reporter (final film role)

Novelisations
Among the novelisations of Michael Pertwee screenplays, each released shortly before its respective film, are:
 Salt and Pepper by Alex Austin
 One More Time by Michael Avallone 
 Strange Bedfellows by Marvin H. Albert. 
Each of the novelists was a notable author of the era.

References

External links

1916 births
1991 deaths
Michael
English male screenwriters
English television writers
20th-century English dramatists and playwrights
English male dramatists and playwrights
20th-century English male writers
British male television writers
20th-century English screenwriters